In differential geometry, the Euler characteristic of an orbifold, or orbifold Euler characteristic, is a generalization of the topological Euler characteristic that includes contributions coming from nontrivial automorphisms. In particular, unlike a topological Euler characteristic, it is not restricted to integer values and is in general a rational number. It is of interest in mathematical physics, specifically in string theory.

See also 
Kawasaki's Riemann–Roch formula

References

External links 
https://mathoverflow.net/questions/51993/euler-characteristic-of-orbifolds
https://mathoverflow.net/questions/267055/is-every-rational-realized-as-the-euler-characteristic-of-some-manifold-or-orbif

Differential geometry
String theory